The Platte Purchase Bridge was a continuous truss bridge over the Missouri River that handled northbound U.S. Route 69, connecting the Seventh Street Trafficway in Fairfax, Kansas with Interstate 635 (Kansas–Missouri) in Riverside, Missouri. Its biggest span was 465.96 feet and it is 2552.19 feet long and had a deck width of 28.31 feet and vertical clearance of 15.02 feet. The bridge was named for the Platte Purchase.

History
The bridge was opened in 1957 to alleviate traffic concerns on the older Fairfax Bridge. The Platte Purchase Bridge carries northbound traffic, while the older span carries southbound traffic. 

In 2013 plans were announced for replacement of both the Platte Purchase Bridge and the Fairfax Bridge. When the latter closed on October 31, 2014, the Platte Purchase span was restriped to handle two-way traffic. The Platte Purchase bridge was set for demolition in late 2016 when the new bridge opened. The first detonation occurred on the morning of Friday, December 9, 2016, and the rest of the bridge was demolished on Thursday, January 12, 2017.

The replacement bridge was formally opened by the Missouri Department of Transportation on March 16, 2017.

See also
List of crossings of the Missouri River

References

Bridges in Kansas City, Kansas
Buildings and structures in Platte County, Missouri
Transportation in the Kansas City metropolitan area
Bridges over the Missouri River
Bridges completed in 1957
Road bridges in Missouri
Road bridges in Kansas
U.S. Route 69
Bridges of the United States Numbered Highway System
Buildings and structures demolished in 2017
Interstate vehicle bridges in the United States